Boire is the French verb to drink. It may also refer to:

 Nashua Airport, also known as Boire Field
 A 1995 album by French singer Miossec
 An alternate name for Detarium senegalense, also called Sweet Detar or Tallow Tree

People with the surname
 Alain Boire (born 1971), a Quebecker politician
 Ronald Boire (born 1961), American businessman

See also
 Morgan Marquis-Boire (born 1980), New Zealand-born hacker, journalist, and security researcher